The Liberals for Åland is a liberal political party on the Åland Islands. The party is an observer member of the Liberal International. In the 2015 legislative elections, the party received the largest number of votes and won 7 out of 30 seats. The current party leader is Katrin Sjögren.

Elections

See also
Liberalism
Liberalism worldwide
List of liberal parties

References

External links
Official website 

Liberal parties in Finland
Political parties in Åland
1978 establishments in Finland
Political parties established in 1978